Addeham Enna Iddeham is a 1993 Malayalam-language comedy-drama film directed by Viji Thampi, starring Jagadish, Siddique, Maathu, and Raghuvaran in major roles.

Plot

Benny (Siddique), a gangster, is released from prison after five years. He witnesses Joji Pereira (Jagadish) robbing a Tamil-speaking employee (Jagathy Sreekumar) of his money. After a long chase, Benny and Perera crash a stolen auto-rickshaw and Benny gets severely injured. He is taken to an old woman named Margaret (Sukumari) by Pereira. Perera reveals that he robbed the bank employee to afford a surgery for his mentally disturbed sister so that she could lead a normal life. She had lost her sanity after witnessing the death of her fiance in an accident where he was run over by a heavy vehicle. Meanwhile, Pereira is framed for various crimes by a gang led by another man also named Pereira (Raghuvaran), who is part of the Bombay underworld. This confuses the police and the bank employee. The police beat up many innocent people on suspicion of being Pereira. The gangster visits the police station disguised as a policeman. Later, the real policeman Vishwanath (Rizabawa arrives from Mumbai which leads to the climax of the movie

Cast

 Jagadish as Joji Pereira
 Siddique as Benny
 Maathu as Nancy
 Sunitha as Mercy
 Jagathy Sreekumar as Ananthakrishnan Swamy
 Janardhanan as Superintendent of Police Sreekantan Nair
 Raghuvaran as Pereira                                      
 Innocent as Circle Inspector Balachandran Nair
 Mala Aravindan as Head Constable Kunjeesho
 Rajan P. Dev as Unnithan
 Vijayaraghavan as Muthu
 Mamukkoya as Saidali
 Sukumari as Margaret
 Rizabawa as Superintendent of Police Vishwanath, Mumbai
 Jagannathan as Police Constable Shankaran
 Ragini as Kamakshi, Swamy's wife
 Sonia as Annie
 T. P. Madhavan as Satheeshan, Company Manager
 Jagannatha Varma as Neurologist
 Manu Varma as Freddy
 Thrissur Elsy as Sreekandan Nair's wife
 Kanakalatha as Saidali's wife

Songs

References

External links
 

1990s Malayalam-language films
1993 films
Indian comedy-drama films
Films shot in Mumbai
Films directed by Viji Thampi
Films scored by Johnson